The Man Behind the Gun is a 1953 American Western film about the establishment of the city of Los Angeles. It was directed by Felix Feist and stars Randolph Scott.

Plot
Working as an undercover agent, Ransome Callicut travels west by stagecoach. Notorious bandit Vic Sutro tries to rob it, but Callicut captures him and turns over Sutro to an Army captain, Roy Giles, upon arrival in California.

School teacher Lora Roberts, another passenger, has made the trip to marry Giles, but she becomes ensnared in Senator Mark Sheldon's nefarious schemes and also discovers Giles has been seeing Chona Degnon, a singer.

Sheldon murders a rival senator, Creegan, and fakes his own death. He kidnaps Lora as well. After she realizes that Callicut is actually a government agent, Lora persuades Chona that she can have Giles for herself if only she'll come to her aid. Sheldon also kills Chona before she can betray him, but he is brought to justice by Callicut, who is kissed by a grateful Lora.

Cast
 Randolph Scott as Maj. Ransome Callicut aka Rick Bryce
 Patrice Wymore as Lora Roberts
 Dick Wesson as "Monk" Walker
 Philip Carey as Capt. Roy Giles
 Lina Romay as Chona Degnon
 Roy Roberts as Sen. Mark Sheldon
 Morris Ankrum as Bram Creegan
 Katharine Warren as Phoebe Sheldon
 Alan Hale Jr. as Olaf Swenson
 Douglas Fowley as Buckley
 Tony Caruso as Vic Sutro
 Clancy Cooper as Kansas Collins 
 Robert Cabal as Joaquin Murietta

References

External links
 
 
 
 

1953 films
1953 Western (genre) films
American Western (genre) films
Films scored by David Buttolph
Warner Bros. films
1950s English-language films
Films directed by Felix E. Feist
1950s American films